PS George Rennie was a steel-hulled ship scuttled in the lee of Hawking Point, Magnetic Island, Queensland, Australia. It was built in 1885 in Middlesex as a 151-gross-ton paddle steamer. In 1896 the vessel was purchased by Howard Smith and Company who converted it into a lighter. Howard Smith and Company used the vessel to transport coal from the anchorage at West Point to Townsville harbour. It was scuttled in 1902 to serve as a breakwater for a small jetty in the bay. The remains of the ship can still be seen at low tide from Picnic Bay beach.

See also

 List of shipwrecks

References

Shipwrecks of Magnetic Island
Ships built in England
1885 ships
Maritime incidents in 1902
1902 in Australia
1871–1900 ships of Australia
Colliers of Australia
Paddle steamers of Australia
Ships sunk as breakwaters